Popular news caster, Carnatic vocalist and Konakkol exponent H. Ramakrishnan has over 40 years of experience as a journalist. He has worked in State-run media doordarshan, ((All India Radio)), Press Information Bureau and Directorate of Advertising and Visual Publicity in various capacities. The people of Tamil Nadu, India still remember him as a very famous newscaster, whose distinct voice would come out clearly.

Affected by polio at the age of two and a half years, H Ramakrishnan had to battle out every step in life. Even when he had to attend school he was denied admission to the local school and had to be taken to a different school in a different town by his maternal grandfather. After he passed the UPSC exam when Ramakrishnan went to join duty as either news reader, translator or reporter but he was not accepted for the post because of his handicap (he has polio in both his legs).

Despite having a disability of 85 percent, Ramakrishnan moved around by buses until he got a side car scooter. Later on he used to drive an autorickshaw with a hand brake, specially fitted for him by Bajaj Auto Ltd. When he was in service a senior official had mentioned the fact that he was physically disabled in Ramakrishnan's confidential report but then Ramakrishnan went to the  President V. V. Giri, who immediately passed an order that the fact that people are disabled must not be considered while evaluating them in their Confidential Reports. He also runs Arohana and Sri Bhairavi Gana Sabha, two organisations to propagate Carnatic music.

He runs a charitable trust called Krupa to help specially abled persons to buy hearing aids, walking sticks, tricycles and calipers.

Journalism
The first person to report live on Tamil News, H Ramakrishnan has been a great source of inspiration for many. He has wielded the microphone for many important assignments including the launch of rockets from Sriharikota and caught politicians and VIPs like Former Chief Minister M. Karunanidhi, Chief Minister J Jayalalithaa, the late President Abdul Kalam for quotes.
         
For Doordarshan he has interviewed Industrialists N. Mahalingan and M. A. M. Ramaswamy, Musicians including Semmangudi Srinivasa Iyer, D. K Pattammal, Actors Gemini Ganesan, Thengai Srinivasan, Prem Nazir, Balachandra Menon, Thikkurisi Sukumaran Nair, Madhu, journalists Dinamalar Krishnamurthy, Tugluk Cho Ramaswamy and Sivandhi Aadhithan of Dina Thanthi.

News reading
His love for reading news began even while he was at school. He wrote to Melville de Mellow the great commentator and newscaster, who asked him to complete college and then apply to read news at AIR. After a few years, he joined AIR and then later DDK and read news for over 25 years in both media. He was one of the first news readers of Doordarshan Chennai and was perhaps the first differently abled person to rise up to the level of Senior Administrative Grade officer in the Ministry of Information and Broadcasting, Government of India.

For three years, he was also Public Relations Manager with Indian Bank and was instrumental in bringing out the in house magazine IndImage and also for conducting the Platinum jubilee of the bank. The bank is now celebrating its 100th year. Having been at the helm of affairs in the news room for over two decades, he has thorough knowledge of news writing, reporting, visual editing and manpower management.

He has acted in a couple of Tamil films including one by name Vaaname Ellai directed by K Balachander. The film was a super hit and H Ramakrishnan's role as a disabled person (which he is in real life too) who changes the mind of youngsters, who wanted to commit suicide had made a remarkable impact on the film viewing public. Also in another K Balachander movie Jathi Malli as a Doctor.

Musician
A musician, he has presented concerts at the prestigious Music Academy, Tyagaraja Aradhana in Thiruvaiyaru, All India Radio and other Sabhas. A percussionist, he learnt to play the Mridangam from Palani Subramaniam Pillai, and is presently learning from Karaikudi Mani. He plays the Kanjira and is an expert in Konnakkol (spelt Konakol of Konnakol). (Konnakkol is normally an oral accompaniment to Carnatic concerts and a Konnakkol artist, recites a particular kind of rhythmic pattern like that of the Mridangist (drummer)). In recognition of this talent, he has been awarded the Kalaimamani award by the Government of Tamil Nadu for his contributions to the art of Konnakkol. 
He is the secretary of a music Sabha called Sri Bhairavi Gana Sabha in Chennai. The sabha has been organising concerts of musicians including S. P. Balasubramaniam, O.S. Arun, Aruna Sayeeram and presented awards to Sabha secretaries, musicians and dancers.

Having a law degree to his credit and belonging to a family of judges (he is great grandson of H Ramakrishna Iyer, Judge at the Travancore High Court, his father R. Harihara Iyer retired as a District and Sessions Judge), H Ramakrishnan does not practice as an advocate.  He has experience starting and running industries like mineral water plants and milk processing plants and offers consultancy services. A writer and an avid reader, he has written a couple of books on the Hindu religion. He has also contributed to the columns of The Hindu, Indian Express, Dinamani, Kalki, Tuglaq, ChennaiOnline.com. He is married to Vasanthaa and has four children.

External links
http://www.hramakrishnan.com
http://www.hinduonnet.com/thehindu/fr/2006/01/20/stories/2006012002420600.htm
http://www.tn.gov.in/pressrelease/archives/pr2003/pr251103a/pr251103a.htm
http://www.pantagraph.com/features/feat043006.shtml
http://www.hinduonnet.com/thehindu/2003/10/11/stories/2003101106480400.htm
https://web.archive.org/web/20061104164850/http://www.kutcheribuzz.com/kbusa/news/thiruvaiyaru.htm
https://web.archive.org/web/20060517220128/http://www.sruti.com/Mar03/bnote.htm

https://web.archive.org/web/20111121202115/http://archives.chennaionline.com/Personality/interview_with_ram1.aspx

Indian male television journalists
Mridangam players
Kanjira players
1941 births
Living people
Indian radio journalists
All India Radio people